The 2021 Dixie State Trailblazers football team represented Dixie State University—now known as Utah Tech University—as a member of the Western Athletic Conference (WAC) during the 2021 NCAA Division I FCS football season. They were led by third-year head coach Paul Peterson and played their home games at Greater Zion Stadium in St. George, Utah. Due to the NCAA's transition rules, they were not eligible for the 2021 FCS Playoffs.  Dixie State did not play a full WAC schedule in 2021 due to previous non-conference contracts.

This was Dixie State's final season under that name; the school will change its name to Utah Tech University effective with the 2022–23 school year. The Trailblazers nickname is not affected.

Previous season

The Trailblazers finished the 2020–21 season with a 2–3 overall record. Like most other FCS teams in the United States, Dixie State opted for a spring season due to the COVID-19 pandemic.

Preseason

WAC Preseason teams
The Western Athletic Conference coaches released their preseason poll and teams on July 27, 2021. Dixie State was not included in the preseason poll since the Trailblazers are not playing a full WAC schedule due to previous non-conference game contracts.  Dixie State players were eligible for individual rewards.  Quali Conley was chosen to the Preseason All-WAC Offense Team.

Preseason All–WAC Team

Offense

Quali Conley – Running Back, FR

Schedule

Game summaries

Sacramento State

No. 10 Weber State

at No. 14 UC Davis

at No. 2 South Dakota State

at No. 6 Montana

Tarleton State

Stephen F. Austin

at Delaware

at No. 1 Sam Houston

Fort Lewis

No. 14 Missouri State

References

Dixie State
Utah Tech Trailblazers football seasons
Dixie State Trailblazers football